Herr Puntila and His Servant Matti may refer to:
 Herr Puntila and His Servant Matti (1979 film), a Finnish-Swedish drama film
 Herr Puntila and His Servant Matti (1960 film), an Austrian comedy film